Popowia is a genus of flowering plants in the family Annonaceae. There are about 50 species distributed in tropical Asia and Africa and in Oceania.

These are shrubs and trees. The inflorescence is a solitary flower or a cluster of several. The small, bisexual flowers have six thick petals in two whorls; the petals are sometimes joined to form a cup shape.

Species include:
 Popowia beddomeana Hook.f. & Thomson
 Popowia fusca King
 Popowia greveana (Baill.) Ghesq.
 Popowia pauciflora Maingay ex Hook.f. & Th.
 Popowia perakensis King
 Popowia pisocarpa
 Popowia velutina King

References

 
Annonaceae genera
Taxonomy articles created by Polbot